Kelly Mountain, with a summit elevation of , is a peak in the Smoky Mountains of Idaho. The peak is located in Blaine County on the border of Sawtooth National Forest and Bureau of Land Management land. It is located in the watersheds of Elk, Kelly, and Wolftone creeks, all in the watershed of the Big Wood River. No roads or trails go to the summit.

References

External links
 

Bureau of Land Management areas in Idaho
Mountains of Blaine County, Idaho
Mountains of Idaho
Sawtooth National Forest